Get Lost may refer to:

 Getting lost, an occurrence of losing spatial reference; losing one's way

Albums
 Get Lost (Huntingtons album) (1999)
 Get Lost (The Magnetic Fields album) (1995)
 Get Lost, by Mark McGuire (2012)

Songs
 "Get Lost" (Icona Pop song) (2014)
 "Get Lost", by Patrick Wolf from The Magic Position (2007)
 "(I) Get Lost", by Eric Clapton (1999)

Other uses
 Get Lost (film), a 1956 Woody Woodpecker cartoon short subject
 Get Lost!, a 1981 British television drama serial
 Get Lost Magazine, a travel magazine
 Getting Lost, a 2022 memoir by Annie Ernaux

See also
 Get Lost, Find Yourself, an album by Chunk! No, Captain Chunk! (2015)